Jonathan Charles Cozart (born April 26, 1992), also known by his online alias   Paint, is an American YouTube personality, musician, and comedian. As of March 2023, his main YouTube channel has 4.64 million subscribers.

Personal life 
Cozart was born in Little Rock, Arkansas, and raised in Houston, Texas, from the age of six. After graduating from Cypress Creek High School in 2011, he moved to Austin, Texas and studied film at University of Texas. Cozart took piano lessons as a child.

Cozart is bisexual, and came out publicly in June 2017.

In late January 2022, he announced on Instagram that he has been in a relationship with Sarah Sharpe since early 2021.

Career

YouTube career 

His YouTube channel "Paint", an account gifted to him by his brother, was created on December 27, 2005, and has over 4.72 million subscribers as of March 2021. Cozart's career in video started in middle school as a way to avoid writing papers, offering to make videos instead, and he continued this through high school.

On July 17, 2011, Cozart uploaded "Harry Potter in 99 Seconds", which quickly became a viral video, with 61 million views as of November 2022.

Cozart grew his audience on YouTube with his Disney parody videos, which place Disney Princesses into modern circumstances through a cappella layering of his own voice to supply the music. "After Ever After" was uploaded in 2013, and has amassed 94 million views as of November 2022. "After Ever After 2" was released in 2014 and "After Ever After 3" was released in 2018. He then went on hiatus after November of that year, but returned in October 2020 with the video "If Trump Was In Hamilton."

Live shows 

In 2015, Cozart performed his own one-man show, "Laughter Ever After", at the Edinburgh Fringe Festival. His live performance of musical comedy was well-reviewed by attendees, stating, "Jon Cozart delights with his witty, heartfelt music."

Cozart joined fellow YouTube musicians Dodie Clark, Tessa Violet, and Rusty Clanton in 2016 for selected shows of the small and intimate Transatlantic Tour along the east coast.

Other work 
Cozart hosted the 7th Streamy Awards on September 26, 2017. His hosting turn was described as "vicious" by Newsweek, and the show included a musical number in which Cozart compared nominee Jake Paul to then-U.S. President Donald Trump. Cozart described his approach as satirizing the perceived "hypocrisy of the new media industry."

Cozart played the role of Donny Meadows in the 2020 web series Wayward Guide for the Untrained Eye, and the role of the bard Diedrich Knickerbocker in Shipwrecked Comedy's 2022 web series Headless: A Sleepy Hollow Story.

Awards and nominations

References

External links
Paint on YouTube

1992 births
20th-century LGBT people
21st-century American comedians
21st-century American male musicians
21st-century LGBT people
American comedy musicians
Bisexual men
Bisexual musicians
Comedians from Arkansas
Comedians from Texas
Entertainers from Houston
LGBT YouTubers
LGBT people from Arkansas
LGBT people from Texas
Living people
Moody College of Communication alumni
Music YouTubers
Musicians from Houston
Musicians from Little Rock, Arkansas
People from Austin, Texas
YouTubers from Texas